Njivice is a small settlement in the Municipality of Radeče in eastern Slovenia. It lies on Sopota Creek west of the town of Radeče. The area is part of the historical region of Lower Carniola. The municipality is now included in the Lower Sava Statistical Region; until January 2014 it was part of the Savinja Statistical Region.

References

External links
Njivice at Geopedia

Populated places in the Municipality of Radeče